Gösta Arvidsson (21 August 1925 – 16 February 2012) was a Swedish shot putter who finished fifth at the 1948 Summer Olympics. He won the national title in 1950 and 1951, placing second in 1948.

References

External links
 

1925 births
2012 deaths
People from Falköping Municipality
Athletes (track and field) at the 1948 Summer Olympics
Olympic athletes of Sweden
Swedish male shot putters
Sportspeople from Västra Götaland County